Macrosemimimus is an extinct genus of semionotiform ray-finned fish from the Late Jurassic of Germany, England and France.

References

Semionotiformes
Jurassic animals of Europe